Halidamia is a genus of sawflies belonging to the family Tenthredinidae.

The species of this genus are found in Europe and Northern America.

Species:
 Halidamia affinis (Fallén, 1807)

References

Tenthredinidae
Sawfly genera